Martin Ondeko (born 16 July 1985) is a former Ugandan international cricketer who represented the Ugandan national side between 2007 and 2008. He played as a right-handed opening batsman

Ondeko was born in the town of Entebbe, in Uganda's Central Region. He represented the Uganda under-19s at the 2004 Under-19 World Cup in Bangladesh, featuring in four of his team's six matches. In Uganda's final game of the tournament, a five-wicket win against Canada, he scored 99 not out from 148 balls, for which he was named man of the match. Ondeko's senior debut for Uganda came in September 2007, when he played against Bangladesh in the 2007 Kenya Twenty20 Quadrangular. Later in the year, he made a single appearance in the 2007 World Cricket League Division Two tournament in Namibia, which held List A status. He was called into the team for the fifth-place play-off against Argentina – a dead rubber – and scored nine runs before being trapped leg before wicket by Diego Lord. Ondeko's final match for Uganda came in February 2008, against a touring Marylebone Cricket Club team.

Martin Ondeko is serving as the Chief Executing Officer (CEO) of Uganda Cricket Association.

References

External links
Player profile and statistics at Cricket Archive
Player profile and statistics at ESPNcricinfo

1985 births
Living people
People from Wakiso District
Ugandan cricketers
Ugandan cricket administrators